Sever do Vouga is a freguesia in Sever do Vouga, Aveiro District, Portugal. The population in 2011 was 2,777, in an area of 11.58 km2.

References

Freguesias of Sever do Vouga